Fendlera is a genus of shrubs in the Hydrangeaceae. They are most commonly known as fendlerbush. The name fendlerbush is also used for the closely related genus Fendlerella.

The genus was named for Augustus Fendler in 1852.

References

Hydrangeaceae
Cornales genera
Flora of North America